The 1993 Trans-Tasman Test series was an international rugby league test series played in Australia between Australia and New Zealand. The series, which started on 20 June in Auckland and finished on 30 June in Brisbane, consisted of three test matches. The three Tests attracted a total of 74,494 fans.

The Test series was broadcast into Australia via the Seven Network with commentary provided by Graeme Hughes, Graham Lowe and John Monie with recently retired former Australian dual-rugby international Michael O'Connor the sideline reporter.

Australia
The Australians, coached by Bob Fulton, had been crowned Rugby League World Cup champions after winning the 1992 Rugby League World Cup Final for the 7th time at Wembley Stadium. Mal Meninga captained the side in the final two tests of the Trans-Tasman series but was forced to miss the first test after being suspended by the NSWRL for the use of an elbow on Manly-Warringah's Welsh import centre John Devereux in a club game. Ironically, Manly's coach was also Australian coach Bob Fulton. The captaincy for the first test fell to Meninga's Canberra Raiders team mate and New South Wales captain Laurie Daley.

The test series took place following the 1993 State of Origin series which was won by NSW. Dale Shearer's performances at fullback for Qld saw him earn a test recall in front of well performed World Cup and NSW fullback Tim Brasher (though Shearer had been selected at centre for all 3 Ashes series tests in 1992 but withdrew from all 3 with injury). Bradley Clyde, who had not played in the Origin series due to injury was also recalled to the team.

New Zealand
The Kiwis, coached by Howie Tamati and captained by Gary Freeman had lost their 1992 home series against the touring Great Britain Lions. New Zealand would be without their goal kicking fullback Matthew Ridge who had suffered a season ending knee injury in a club game for Manly-Warringah, but would lack for nothing in goal kicking thanks to the presence of North Sydney Bears superboot winger Daryl Halligan.

First Test
Due to sponsorship, the series was known as the Lion Red Test Series.

Australia went into the game without regular captain Mal Meninga who had been suspended for 2 games. It would be the first test Meninga had missed since 1988. With Meninga out, the captaincy for the test was handed to NSW captain, Meninga's Canberra Raiders team mate Laurie Daley. Dale Shearer made his return to test football after starring at fullback for Queensland in the final 2 games of the State of Origin series to beat out well performed New South Wales and 1992 World Cup Final fullback Tim Brasher. The Kiwis were captained by veteran halfback Gary Freeman, but would be without goal kicking dual-rugby international fullback Matthew Ridge who had suffered a season ending knee injury playing for the Bob Fulton coached Manly-Warringah in a Winfield Cup game with coach Howie Tamati handing the #1 jumper to Balmain's utility back Morvin Edwards. Despite the loss of Ridge, the Kiwis lost nothing in goal kicking with the selection of North Sydney Bears winger Daryl Halligan.

The Australian's created history with the selection of all three Walters brothers, five-eighth Kevin, hooker Steve and reserve hooker Kerrod for the test, though Kerrod Walters did not get off the bench.

The first test at Auckland's Mt Smart Stadium almost produced a shock result. After three first half goals from Daryl Halligan and two tries from winger Sean Hoppe, one an intercept off a Dale Shearer pass that saw him race 80 metres and out-pace Shearer and Willie Carne, the Kiwis led 14-13 at half time. The Australians scored two tries next to the posts through both Shearer and Steve Walters (who scored with only seconds left in the half) with Shearer easily kicking both conversions, while a field goal from Laurie Daley after Shearers try gave the Australians a 7-2 lead until Hoppe's first try.

Midway through the first half, English referee Russell Smith earned the ire of the Australian's when he ignored a Gary Mercer spear tackle on Bradley Clyde, then on the next tackle also ignored a high tackle by Tawera Nikau on Paul Harragon which caused the Australian front rower to lose the ball with Smith ruling a knock-on. Smith also denied both sides what looked to be legitimate tries with Steve Walters denied one in the first half following a dart from dummy half, and replacement Kiwi forward John Lomax denied in the second half despite television replays showing that he clearly got the ball down on the Australian line.

The second half was scoreless until the 77th minute when a cool under pressure Laurie Daley (who had already missed one attempt to tie the scores) slotted his second field goal to salvage a 14-all draw for the reigning World Champions.

Second Test
The Australian's made several changes to their line up for the second test. Captain Mal Meninga returned from suspension with Laurie Daley moved from the centres to 5/8 in place of Kevin Walters who moved to the bench at the expense of his brother and Brisbane Broncos team mate Kerrod Walters. Ian Roberts was ruled out with injury with David Gillespie replacing him on the bench while Andrew Ettingshausen returned to the side on the bench in place of Steve Renouf. The only change made by New Zealand coach Howie Tamati was promoting Tony Kemp to start at 5/8 with Tea Ropati dropping to the bench.

After a day of torrential rain, the second test was played on a very wet Palmerston North Showgrounds. The overflow crowd of 19,500 were allowed onto the speedway track and close to the pitch and a number of times in the second half play was halted as a result of balls being lost in the crowd which had been souvenired by spectators. This prompted rival captains Garry Freeman and Mal Meninga to appeal to English referee Russell Smith to actually abandon the game. However, the game continued and the Australia's eventually took a 1-0 lead in the series with a 16-8 win.

Third Test
Australia's series win extended their series streak over New Zealand to 40 years with the Kangaroos not having lost a test series to the Kiwis since 1952.

The only test match played in Australia in 1993 saw some 32,000 turn out at Lang Park in Brisbane to see Australia wrap up the Trans-Tasman series 2-0. Scoring three times themselves, the Kangaroos kept their line intact to run out 16-4 winners and send retiring forward Bob Lindner out on a winning note.

See also
Australian national rugby league team
New Zealand national rugby league team
Australia vs New Zealand in rugby league

References

Tra
Tra
1993
1993
1993
1993
1993
1993